Milena Anna Łukasiewicz is a Polish diplomat, since 2017 she is chargé d'affaires to Venezuela.

Life 

Łukasiewicz graduated from Economics at the University of Warsaw (M.A., 2008). She has been also educated at the University of Strasbourg and Andrés Bello Catholic University (M.A., 2019).

In 2008, she was an intern at the European Commission. In 2011, during the Polish Presidency of the Council of the European Union, she joined the Permanent Representation of Poland to the European Union in Brussels. Next year, she has started her service at the Embassy of Poland in Caracas, Venezuela. On 1 January 2017, she took the post of chargé d’affaires to Venezuela, being additionally accredited to Barbados, Saint Kitts and Nevis, Grenada, Jamaica, Guyana, Suriname, Trinidad and Tobago, Saint Vincent and the Grenadines, Dominica. She is also the Consul.

Besides Polish, she speaks Spanish, English, French, and Portuguese.

References 

1980s births
Living people
Ambassadors of Poland to Venezuela
Andrés Bello Catholic University alumni
University of Warsaw alumni